Unguka Bank Plc (UB), commonly known as Unguka Bank, is a microfinance bank in Rwanda. It is one of the banks licensed by the National Bank of Rwanda, the country's banking regulator.

Overview
, UBL was a small but growing financial service provider, whose total asset valuation and shareholders' equity were publicly unknown at this time. At that time, the bank had 556 shareholders and 14 branches.

History
The institution was founded in 2005, as Unguka Microfinance Limited, by 215 investors with total capital of about US$538,400 (RWF:321.1 million). In 2008, the bank's processes were automated. In 2012, the institution transformed into a microfinance bank, following the issuance of a microfinance banking licence by the National Bank of Rwanda. The bank rebranded as Unguka Bank Limited.

Ownership
The stock of Uguka Bank is privately owned by corporate and individual investors. At this time, the detailed shareholding in the bank is not publicly known. 35% shareholding is owned by Rural Impulse Fund II (RIF).

See also
 List of banks in Rwanda
 Economy of Rwanda

References

External links
 

Banks of Rwanda
Banks established in 2005
2005 establishments in Rwanda
Organisations based in Kigali
Economy of Kigali